Athanasius Atule Usuh (1949 – July 14, 2016) was a Roman Catholic bishop.

Ordained to the priesthood in 1971, Usuh served as coadjutor bishop of the Roman Catholic Diocese of Makurdi, Nigeria from 1987 to 1989, then as bishop there until 2015.

References

1949 births
2016 deaths
20th-century Roman Catholic bishops in Nigeria
21st-century Roman Catholic bishops in Nigeria
Roman Catholic bishops of Makurdi